Kan Kheha station is a railway station in Don Mueang District, Bangkok. It serves the SRT Dark Red Line. Kan Kheha station was built above the existing Kan Kheha KM.19 ground-level railway halt on the State Railway of Thailand's Northern and Northeastern Main Line which primarily served commuter trains.

History 
The station opened on 2 August 2021 following the opening of the SRT Dark Red Line. Kan Kheha KM.19 Halt closed on 19 January 2023 after all services started operating on the elevated tracks.

References 

Railway stations in Thailand